Antony Pappusamy (born 1 October 1949) is the serving Archbishop of Roman Catholic Archdiocese of Madurai in India.

Early life and education 
He was born on 1 October 1949 in Marambadi, Tamil Nadu. He completed his high school education from R.C. Higher Secondary School, Trichy and also did a Courses on Latin and Initiation from St. Peter's Seminary, Madurai. He completed his graduation from St Joseph's College, Tiruchirappalli. He completed his studies in Theology and Philosophy from St. Paul's Seminary, Trichy. He is an alumnus of Pontifical Lateran University and has acquired a Diploma in Spirituality from Pontifical University of Saint Thomas Aquinas.

Priesthood 
He was ordained a Catholic priest on 7 July 1976.

Episcopate 
He was appointed Auxiliary Bishop of Madurai and Titular Bishop of Zaba on 5 November 1998 and ordained a Bishop on 4 February 1999. He was appointed Bishop of Roman Catholic Diocese of Dindigul on 10 November 2003. He was appointed Archbishop of Roman Catholic Archdiocese of Madurai on 26 July 2014 by Pope Francis. He also chairs Tamil Nadu Bishops' Council's commission for Clergy and Religious.

He was Appointed Apostolic Administrator of the Diocese of Palayamkottai on 29 June 2018 by Pope Francis. He replaced Bishop Jude Gerald Paulraj. He continued to remain the Apostolic Administrator until the consecration of Bishop Antonysamy (Bishop of Palaymkottai).

On 6 June 2020, he was appointed as Apostolic Administrator of Kuzhithurai upon the resignation of Bishop Jerome Dhas Varuvel, S.D.B.

Book 
Christian Commitment to Service : Faith in Practice in honour of Antony Pappusamy is published by Christian World Imprints.

References 

1949 births
Living people
People from Tamil Nadu
21st-century Roman Catholic archbishops in India
Pontifical University of Saint Thomas Aquinas alumni